Abab ('Raise' or 'Grow') was the national anthem of Ogadenia, a country proposed by the ONLF. It was sung in Somali. The current national anthem of Ogadenia is Qaran.

Lyrics
Abab

Dhiigii dadkaygow
Nimcadii dhulkayow
Dhididkii duqaydow
Agabkii dhallaankow
Dhaayahayga aragow
Dhagahayga maqalkow
Dhaqankiyo tilmaantow
Dhuuxiyo naftaydow
Dhudhunkii barbaartow
Dhaxalkii agoontow

Midabkaaga dhowrkaa
Midi waa xinjiro dhab ah
Dhimashada wadanigee
Midna waa buluug dhab ah
Soomaalida dhankeedee
Midna waa cagaar dhab ah
Barwaaqada dhulkeenee
Awood allaad ku dhalatayee
Awood allaad ku dhisantayee
Awood allaad ku dhaqantayee
Waligaa dhisnoow ee aamiin aamiin
Waligaa ha dhicinee aamiin aamiin

Dhidibkii Islaamkee
Quraan lagu dhameeyow
Taariikhdiyo dhigaalkow
Halgan la isu dhiibow
Difaac aan dhamaanow
Dhuuxa geesigaygow
Dhabbihii xornimadow
Dhaqaalaha naftowdow
Indhihii xusuustow
Dhaawaca daweeyow

Midabkaaga dhowrkaa
Midi waa xinjiro dhab ah
Dhimashada wadanigee
Midna waa buluug dhab ah
Soomaalida dhankeedee
Midna waa cagaar dhab ah
Barwaaqada dhulkeenee
Awood allaad ku dhalatayee
Awood allaad ku dhisantayee
Awood allaad ku dhaqantayee
Waligaa dhisnoow ee aamiin aamiin
Waligaa ha dhicinee aamiin aamiin

Ku dhex jiraha beerkow
Neef dhowrayaashow
Wadne la iga dheegow
Gacmihiyo dhaqaaqow
Dhabarkiyo xanjaarkow
Caqligaan ku dhaatow
Kulli dhiig mareenkow
Dhammaantii jirkaygow
Dhakhtarkii I baaree
Dhibkaan qabay bogsiiyow

Midabkaaga dhowrkaa
Midi waa xinjiro dhab ah
Dhimashada wadanigee
Midna waa buluug dhab ah
Soomaalida dhankeedee
Midna waa cagaar dhab ah
Barwaaqada dhulkeenee
Awood allaad ku dhalatayee
Awood allaad ku dhisantayee
Awood allaad ku dhaqantayee
Waligaa dhisnoow ee aamiin aamiin
Waligaa ha dhicinee aamiin aamiin

Unofficial English translation

Raise (Grow)

The blood of my people
The resources of my land
The sweat of my ancestors
The wealth of my new generation
The power of my sight
The power of my hearing
The history of our tradition
The energy of my soul
The might of our youth
The heritage of our orphanage

Your various colors translate
One is pure blood
The sacrifice of patriotism
One is pure blue
From our Somali side
One is pure green
For our land's prosperity
You are born by the power of God
You stand in his grace
You will stay in his grace
He shall forever reign! Amen! Amen!
He shall never fall! Amen! Amen!

The pillar of Islam
Completed with the holy Quran
The records of history
The struggle passed from generation to generation
The unfinished defense
The power of the hero
The way of independence
The wealth of my life
The eyes of our memories
The healer of our wounds

Your various colors translate
One is pure blood
The sacrifice of patriotism
One is pure blue
From our Somali side
One is pure green
For our land's prosperity
You are born by the power of God
You stand in his grace
You will stay in his grace
He shall forever reign! Amen! Amen!
He shall never fall! Amen! Amen!

A piece of my liver
The guardian of my lungs
A part of my heart
My hands and my movement
My back and my chest
The renewer of my intellect
My circulation system
My entire body
My diagnosing doctor
Who healed my illness

Your various colors translate
One is pure blood
The sacrifice of patriotism
One is pure blue
From our Somali side
One is pure green
For our land's prosperity
You are born by the power of God
You stand in his grace
You will stay in his grace
He shall forever reign! Amen! Amen!
He shall never fall! Amen! Amen!

Notes

References
onlf.org Ogaden National Anthem
Abab music video

Historical national anthems